Shahrood  (also Romanized as Shâhrūd, and Shahroud; also known as Shârūd) is a city and capital of Shahrood County, Semnan Province, Iran.

Situated about an altitude of 1345 m, it is located at latitude 36°25'N, longitude 055°01'E. The main launch site of the Iranian Space Agency is near Shahrood. It is also well known for unique types of grapes which are cultivated specially in Shahrud. Consequently, Shahrood is known as the City of Grapes.

Although absent from earlier historical sources, Shahrud has become an important town since the 19th century because of its location on the road from Tehran east to Khorasan. It now also is on the railway. A road runs from Shahrud across the Alborz mountains to the Caspian coastal plains in the north; it is accessible throughout winter. Shahrud was renamed Imāmrūd after the Iranian Revolution of 1979, but has since reverted to the old name. It is located just south of the historical city of Bastam.

Geography 
Some 410 kilometers to the east of Tehran, halfway between the capital and Mashad, and at the junction with the Gorgan road, sits the modern city of Shahrud, which has grown to absorb the historic town of Bastam situated in the hills a few kilometers to the north.

From the north, it is surrounded by the Alborz mountains, and from the south by the arid salty deserts. The river of Tash, after crossing this town, reaches the south deserts. The weather on the mountainous areas is cold and it is somewhat temperate in other parts of the city.

Shahrud is located in the Damghan basin, a sub-basin of the Kavir basin which also contains the Great Salt Desert.

Climate 
Shahrud has a cold desert climate (Köppen climate classification BWk) with hot summers and very cold winters with freezing nights. Precipitation is very low, and mostly falls in winter (often as snow) and spring.

History 
In 2006, traces of a prehistoric, 8000-year-old settlements were found in Shahrud. This is the pre-historical site of Deh Kheyr, Semnan, located in Shahrud Plain, 15 kilometers from the city of Shahrud. The discoveries included ovens, craft workshops, and other evidence of settlements.

Archeological excavations in different parts of Shahrud Plain indicate the existence of villages in this area during 7-5 millennium BC.

As a modern city, the city of Shahrud was merely a village before the reign of Fath Ali Shah of the Qajar dynasty, with two old castles and a small farm named "Shabdary". The surrounding areas however, such as Biarjomand, Miami and Bastam do have a distant history.

The old town of Bastam is located 6 km north of Shahrood. Its pre-Islamic history is not clear, but according to some historians, it was built during Shapur II period (310-379 CE). During the Abbasid era, it was the second largest town (following Damghan) in the Qomis province.

The town was visited by Nasser Khosrow Qubadiani, the Iranian poet of the 12th century, and mentioned by him as the center of the Qomis province. Bastam declined during the Mongol era assaults, and Shahrud eventually took its place.

As of 1991, Shahrud had a population of 92,195.

Attractions 
Shahrud's geographical characteristics are varied, with cloud forests in the north and from the south it meets the central desert of Iran. The most interesting geographical and historical attractions of Shahrud are as follows:

 Caspian Hyrcanian mixed forests and High peaks of East-Alborz mountain range, lie in north of the city and shape a marvelous mixture of natural elements.
 Two or three hours left to the sunset, with temperature falls, clouds rush into the forest. Jangal-e Abr (Cloud Forest) is one of the oldest forests in Iran. It is the continuum of northern forests in the south of Alborz mountain range. It is located 30 km north east of Shahrud. The forest is full of steep hills, and a river runs with waterfalls.
 SHAHVAR peak, lies in 25 km north of Shahrud, from north near Negarman village and from south near Tash village, highest peak of East Elbruz mountain range with 4000 m high. Every year thousands of mountain climbers travel to this city to enjoy rock climbing and the surrounding landscapes.
 The Saljuki Mosque which is located in Bastam. Its construction dates to 1120 C.E.
 The Village of Kharaqan which is located 12 km from Bastam. It was a famous village during the 14th and the 15th centuries. The tomb of Abul-Hassan Kharaqani, who is one of the most famous Arefs (mystics) of the Sufi groups of the 12th century, is located in this village. The brick building with its dome dates to the 12th century.
 The Byar Castle ruins, which is located on the south-eastern area of Bastam, and is near to the desert edge of Byarjomand. This castle has an old mosque and an old wall with three gates.
 Shahrud Museum: Dating from the later Qajar and early Pahlavi periods, originally belonging to the Shahrud Municipality and already located in the center of the town, this two-storied structure with brick facing was transformed into the present museum in 1988 after a series of major repair and renovation works. It houses both archaeological and ethnological sections.

Notable people 
 Bayazid Bastami, (9th century) Sufi
 Abol-Hassan Kharaqani, (963-1033) Sufi
 Muhammad ibn Ja'far al-Sadiq, (d.818 CE) historical personality
 Kourosh Yaghmaei, (born 1946) singer
 Mohammad Farhadi, (born 1949) politician
 Ali Farhadi, (born 1950) the first president of Shahrood University
 Ahmad Jalali, (born 1949) scholar
 Davoud Mirbagheri, (born 1958) film director
 Touka Neyestani, (born 1960) cartoonist
 Danial Hakimi, (born 1963) actor
 Zohreh Akhyani, (born 1964) MeK member and politician
 Anahita Nemati, (born 1977) actress
 Laleh Eftekhari, (born 1959) politician
 Abolfazl Fateh, politician
 Davood Mirbaqeri Director

Higher education 
 Islamic Azad University of Shahrood
 Shahrood University of Medical Sciences
 Shahrood University of Technology

References

External links 

 Daily News Of Shahrood

 
Populated places in Shahrud County
Cities in Semnan Province